The Roman Catholic Diocese of Registro is a diocese located in the city of Registro in the Ecclesiastical province of Sorocaba in Brazil.

History
 19 January 1974: Established as Diocese of Registro from the Diocese of Itapeva and Diocese of Santos

Special churches
Minor Basilicas:
Basílica Nossa Senhora das Neves e Bom Jesus, Iguape

Leadership
 Bishops of Registro (Roman rite), in reverse chronological order
 Bishop Manoel Ferreira dos Santos, Júnior, M.S.C. (2018.05.16 - present)
 Bishop José Luíz Bertanha, S.V.D. (1998.05.26 – 2018.05.16)
 Bishop Apparecido José Dias, S.V.D. (1974.12.13 – 1996.06.26), appointed Bishop of Roraima, Roraima

References
 GCatholic.org
 Catholic Hierarchy

Roman Catholic dioceses in Brazil
Christian organizations established in 1974
Registro, Roman Catholic Diocese of
Roman Catholic dioceses and prelatures established in the 20th century